Anwar Shah Kashmiri (known with honorifics as Sayyid Muḥammad Anwar Shāh ibn Mu‘aẓẓam Shāh al-Kashmīrī; 16 November 1875 – 28 May 1933) was a Kashmiri Muslim scholar and  jurist who served as the first principal of Madrasa Aminia and the fourth principal of the Darul Uloom Deoband. He was a student of Mahmud Hasan Deobandi and participated in the Indian freedom struggle through the Jamiat Ulama-e-Hind. His students include Hifzur Rahman Seoharwi, Yousuf Banuri and Zayn al-Abidin Sajjad Meerthi.

Early life and education
Anwar Shah Kashmiri was born in Kashmir on 27 [Shawwal] 1292 AH (16 November 1875) in a Sayyid family. Aged four, he started reading the Quran under the instruction of his father, Muazzam Ali Shah. In 1889, he relocated to Deoband, where he studied at the Darul Uloom for three years. In 1892, he moved to Darul Uloom Deoband where he studied with Mahmud Hasan Deobandi and others. Then, in 1896 (1314 AH), he went to Rashid Ahmad Gangohi and obtained a teaching certificate in Hadith (which he had been studying for two years) and esoteric knowledge.

Career
After graduating from Darul Uloom, he taught in Madrasa Aminia, Delhi, serving as its first principal. In 1903 he went to Kashmir, where he established Faiz-e A'am Madrasah. In 1905 (1323 AH) he performed Hajj. Four years later, he returned to Deoband. Until 1933, he taught books of Hadith without taking a salary. He held the guardianship of Darul Uloom for nearly twelve years. He resigned in 1927 (1346 AH) and went to the Madrasah of Dabhel in western India, where, until 1932 (1351), he taught Hadith. He left his family in 1887 and moved into the Madrasah in India.

He taught at the Madrasah Fay'm for three years before embarking on his Hajj to Mecca and Medina. He visited his Deoband instructor Mahmood Hasan, who persuaded him to take a position teaching in Deoband. When Mahmood Hasan himself subsequently relocated to Medina in 1908, Shah began teaching Hadith. He retained the position until 1927, when he departed after a disagreement with management.

Kashmiri moved to Jamia Islamia Talimuddin along with Azizur Rahman Usmani in 1927 where he taught Hadith until 1932.

Death and legacy
In 1933, Shah became ill and traveled to Deoband for medical care. He continued addressing students there until he died on 28 May 1933. He was survived by his elder son Azhar Shah Qaiser and younger son Anzar Shah Kashmiri. Muhammad Iqbal arranged a condolence ceremony, at which he described Kashmiri as the greatest Islamic scholar of the last five hundred years.

Anwar Shah Kashmiri is regarded by many as one of the most versatile and prolific hadith scholars produced by the subcontinent. In recognition of his contributions in the field of hadith literature and revival of various Islamic sciences, Islamic scholar Sayyid Rashid Rida said, "I have never seen a more distinguished scholar of hadith than Allamah Kashmiri"

Jamia Imam Muhammad Anwar Shah, Deoband is an Islamic school named after Kashmiri. Syrian scholar Abd al-Fattah Abu Ghudda has written a biography of Kashmiri in Arabic. Yunoos Osman wrote his D.Phil thesis Life and Works of Allamah Muhammad Anwar Shah Kashmiri at the University of Durban-Westville.

A book about Kashmiri entitled The Pride OF Kashmir was released in December 2015. During the release of the book, Engineer Rashid, then MLA of Langate renamed Student of the year award of Kupwara to "Moulana Anwar Shah Kashmiri Award for excellence".

Literary works

Kashmiri also wrote poetry and often put his scholarly writings in that form. Some of his articles and manuscripts remain unpublished.

His works include:
 Mushkilat al-Quran
 Fayz al-Barii ala Sahih al-Bukhari
 Anwar al-Baari (Urdu commentary of Sahih Bukhari, compiled by Kashmiri's son-in-law Ahmad Rida Bijnori) 
 al-ʿUrf al Shadhi Sharh Sunan Al-Tirmidhi

Students
Kashmiri's students include Manazir Ahsan Gilani, Muhammad Tayyib Qasmi, Hifzur Rahman Seoharwi, Saeed Ahmad Akbarabadi, Zayn al-Abidin Sajjad Meerthi, Muhammad Miyan Deobandi, Manzur Nu'mani, and Muhammad Shafi Deobandi.

References

Further reading
 
 
 
 
 
 
THE LIFE AND SCIENTIFIC ACTIVITY OF ANWARSHOH KASHMIRI
Contribution of Anwar Shah Kashmiri to the Hadith Literature in India
 
 علامہ محمد انور شاہ کشمیری کے علمی کارنامے
علامہ محمد انور شاہ کشمیری ، ان کے متوسلین اور تلامزہ کی خدمات زبان اردو

External links
 Building Bridges of Harmony (1927 Jamiat Ulama-e-Hind Presidential Speech of Kashmiri)
journal

1875 births
1933 deaths
Hanafis
Maturidis
Deobandis
Hadith scholars
Sunni imams
Indian Sunni Muslim scholars of Islam
Critics of Ahmadiyya
Critics of Wahhabism
Critics of Ibn Taymiyya
Academic staff of Darul Uloom Deoband
Students of Mahmud Hasan Deobandi
Academic staff of Jamia Islamia Talimuddin